Sayat-Nova is a village in the Masis Municipality of the Ararat Province of Armenia. The town was populated by Azerbaijanis before the exodus of Azerbaijanis from Armenia after the outbreak of the Nagorno-Karabakh conflict. In 1988-1989 Armenian refugees from Azerbaijan settled in the village. It was renamed Sayat-Nova after the poet by the same name.

References

External links 

World Gazeteer: Armenia – World-Gazetteer.com

Populated places in Ararat Province